Marlow is a municipality in the Vorpommern-Rügen district, in Mecklenburg-Western Pomerania, Germany. It is situated 14 km southeast of Ribnitz-Damgarten.

Sights
Marlow is well known for the Vogelpark Marlow, a zoo with the focus on birds, in an area of 22 hectares (54 acres).

External links 
 
 Website of Marlow (German)
 Website of the Vogelpark Marlow (German)

References

Cities and towns in Mecklenburg
1459 establishments
Populated places established in the 1450s
Grand Duchy of Mecklenburg-Schwerin